Daniel James Smith, known professionally as T.O.L.D. (The Order of Life and Death), is a British singer, songwriter and record producer based in Los Angeles. Smith's stage name was inspired by Gustav Klimt's painting "Death and Life."

Smith was born in Birmingham, England. He first toured in the U.K. at age 16 but began working under the name T.O.L.D. in 2014. That year Smith released "Lucifer’s Eyes", which became his best-known song. Shortly after, he released his first EP, Heaven. This was followed in 2016 by his debut album, It's Not About the Witches. T.O.L.D. was announced as one of BBC's 'Introducing Artists' of 2019.

Discography

Album

Extended play

Singles

References

External links
 
 
 

Synth-pop singers
Musicians from Birmingham, West Midlands
1992 births
Living people